In organic chemistry, a thiol, or thiol derivative, is any organosulfur compound of the form , where R represents an alkyl or other organic substituent. The  functional group itself is referred to as either a thiol group or a sulfhydryl group, or a sulfanyl group. Thiols are the sulfur analogue of alcohols (that is, sulfur takes the place of oxygen in the hydroxyl group of an alcohol), and the word is a blend of "thio-" with "alcohol".

Many thiols have strong odors resembling that of garlic or rotten eggs. Thiols are used as odorants to assist in the detection of natural gas (which in pure form is odorless), and the "smell of natural gas" is due to the smell of the thiol used as the odorant. Thiols are sometimes referred to as mercaptans or mercapto compounds, a term introduced in 1832 by William Christopher Zeise and is derived from the Latin  ('capturing mercury') because the thiolate group bonds very strongly with mercury compounds.

Structure and bonding 
Thiols of the structure R−SH are referred to as Alkanethiols or Alkyl thiols, in which an alkyl group (R) is attached to a sulfhydryl group (SH). Thiols and alcohols have similar connectivity. Because sulfur atoms are larger than oxygen atoms, the C−S bond lengths – typically around 180 picometres in length – are about 40 picometers longer than a typical C−O bond. The C−S−H angles approach 90° whereas the angle for the C−O−H group is more obtuse. In the solid or liquids, the hydrogen-bonding between individual thiol groups is weak, the main cohesive force being Van der Waals interactions between the highly polarizable divalent sulfur centers.

The S−H bond is much weaker than the O−H bond as reflected in their respective bond dissociation energy (BDE).

Due to the small difference in the electronegativity of sulfur and hydrogen, an S−H bond is moderately polar. In contrast, O−H bonds in hydroxyl groups are more polar. Thiols have a lower dipole moment relative to their corresponding alcohols.

Nomenclature
There are several ways to name the alkylthiols:
 The suffix -thiol is added to the name of the alkane. This method is nearly identical to naming an alcohol and is used by the IUPAC, e.g. CH3SH would be methanethiol.
 The word mercaptan replaces alcohol in the name of the equivalent alcohol compound. Example: CH3SH would be methyl mercaptan, just as CH3OH is called methyl alcohol.
 The term sulfhydryl- or mercapto- is used as a prefix, e.g. mercaptopurine.

Physical properties

Odor
Many thiols have strong odors resembling that of garlic. The odors of thiols, particularly those of low molecular weight, are often strong and repulsive. The spray of skunks consists mainly of low-molecular-weight thiols and derivatives. These compounds are detectable by the human nose at concentrations of only 10 parts per billion. Human sweat contains (R)/(S)-3-methyl-3-mercapto-1-ol (MSH), detectable at 2 parts per billion and having a fruity, onion-like odor. (Methylthio)methanethiol (MeSCH2SH; MTMT) is a strong-smelling volatile thiol, also detectable at parts per billion levels, found in male mouse urine. Lawrence C. Katz and co-workers showed that MTMT functioned as a semiochemical, activating certain mouse olfactory sensory neurons, attracting female mice. Copper has been shown to be required by a specific mouse olfactory receptor, MOR244-3, which is highly responsive to MTMT as well as to various other thiols and related compounds. A human olfactory receptor, OR2T11, has been identified which, in the presence of copper, is highly responsive to the gas odorants (see below) ethanethiol and t-butyl mercaptan as well as other low molecular weight thiols, including allyl mercaptan found in human garlic breath, and the strong-smelling cyclic sulfide thietane.

Thiols are also responsible for a class of wine faults caused by an unintended reaction between sulfur and yeast and the "skunky" odor of beer that has been exposed to ultraviolet light.

Not all thiols have unpleasant odors. For example, furan-2-ylmethanethiol contributes to the aroma of roasted coffee, whereas grapefruit mercaptan, a monoterpenoid thiol, is responsible for the characteristic scent of grapefruit. The effect of the latter compound is present only at low concentrations. The pure mercaptan has an unpleasant odor.

In the United States, natural gas distributors were required to add thiols, originally ethanethiol, to natural gas (which is naturally odorless) after the deadly New London School explosion in New London, Texas, in 1937. Many gas distributors were odorizing gas prior to this event. Most gas odorants utilized currently contain mixtures of mercaptans and sulfides, with t-butyl mercaptan as the main odor constituent in natural gas and ethanethiol in liquefied petroleum gas (LPG, propane). In situations where thiols are used in commercial industry, such as liquid petroleum gas tankers and bulk handling systems, an oxidizing catalyst is used to destroy the odor. A copper-based oxidation catalyst neutralizes the volatile thiols and transforms them into inert products.

Boiling points and solubility
Thiols show little association by hydrogen bonding, both with water molecules and among themselves. Hence, they have lower boiling points and are less soluble in water and other polar solvents than alcohols of similar molecular weight. For this reason also, thiols and their corresponding sulfide functional group isomers have similar solubility characteristics and boiling points, whereas the same is not true of alcohols and their corresponding isomeric ethers.

Bonding
The S−H bond in thiols is weak compared to the O−H bond in alcohols.

Characterization
Volatile thiols are easily and almost unerringly detected by their distinctive odor. Sulfur-specific analyzers for gas chromatographs are useful. Spectroscopic indicators are the D2O-exchangeable SH signal in the 1H NMR spectrum (33S is NMR-active but signals for divalent sulfur are very broad and of little utility). The νSH band appears near 2400 cm−1 in the IR spectrum. In the nitroprusside reaction, free thiol groups react with sodium nitroprusside and ammonium hydroxide to give a red colour.

Preparation
In industry, methanethiol is prepared by the reaction of hydrogen sulfide with methanol. This method is employed for the industrial synthesis of methanethiol:
CH3OH + H2S → CH3SH + H2O
Such reactions are conducted in the presence of acidic catalysts. The other principal route to thiols involves the addition of hydrogen sulfide to alkenes. Such reactions are usually conducted in the presence of an acid catalyst or UV light. Halide displacement, using the suitable organic halide and sodium hydrogen sulfide has also been utilized.

Another method entails the alkylation of sodium hydrosulfide.
 RX + NaSH → RSH + NaX(X = Cl, Br, I)
This method is used for the production of thioglycolic acid from chloroacetic acid.

Laboratory methods
In general, on the typical laboratory scale, the direct reaction of a haloalkane with sodium hydrosulfide is inefficient owing to the competing formation of sulfides. Instead, alkyl halides are converted to thiols via an S-alkylation of thiourea. This multistep, one-pot process proceeds via the intermediacy of the isothiouronium salt, which is hydrolyzed in a separate step:

 CH3CH2Br + SC(NH2)2 → [CH3CH2SC(NH2)2]Br
 [CH3CH2SC(NH2)2]Br + NaOH → CH3CH2SH + OC(NH2)2 + NaBr

The thiourea route works well with primary halides, especially activated ones. Secondary and tertiary thiols are less easily prepared. Secondary thiols can be prepared from the ketone via the corresponding dithioketals. A related two-step process involves alkylation of thiosulfate to give the thiosulfonate ("Bunte salt"), followed by hydrolysis. The method is illustrated by one synthesis of thioglycolic acid:
ClCH2CO2H + Na2S2O3 → Na[O3S2CH2CO2H] + NaCl

Na[O3S2CH2CO2H] + H2O → HSCH2CO2H + NaHSO4

Organolithium compounds and Grignard reagents react with sulfur to give the thiolates, which are readily hydrolyzed:
RLi + S → RSLi
RSLi + HCl → RSH + LiCl

Phenols can be converted to the thiophenols via rearrangement of their O-aryl dialkylthiocarbamates.

Thiols are prepared by reductive dealkylation of sulfides, especially benzyl derivatives and thioacetals.

Thiophenols are produced by S-arylation or the replacement of diazonium leaving group with sulfhydryl anion (SH−):
 + SH− → ArSH + N2

Reactions
Akin to the chemistry of alcohols, thiols form sulfides, thioacetals, and thioesters, which are analogous to ethers, acetals, and esters respectively. Thiols and alcohols are also very different in their reactivity, thiols being more easily oxidized than alcohols. Thiolates are more potent nucleophiles than the corresponding alkoxides.

S-Alkylation
Thiols, or more specific their conjugate bases, are readily alkylated to give sulfides:
RSH + R′Br + B → RSR′ + [HB]Br (B = base)

Acidity
Thiols are easily deprotonated.  Relative to the alcohols, thiols are more acidic. The conjugate base of a thiol is called a thiolate. Butanethiol has a pKa of 10.5 vs 15 for butanol. Thiophenol has a pKa of 6, versus 10 for phenol. A highly acidic thiol is pentafluorothiophenol (C6F5SH) with a pKa of 2.68. Thus, thiolates can be obtained from thiols by treatment with alkali metal hydroxides.

Redox
Thiols, especially in the presence of base, are readily oxidized by reagents such as bromine and iodine to give an organic disulfide (R−S−S−R).
 2 R−SH + Br2 → R−S−S−R + 2 HBr
Oxidation by more powerful reagents such as sodium hypochlorite or hydrogen peroxide can also yield sulfonic acids (RSO3H).
 R−SH + 3 H2O2 → RSO3H + 3 H2O
Oxidation can also be effected by oxygen in the presence of catalysts:
 2 R–SH +  O2 → RS−SR + H2O

Thiols participate in thiol-disulfide exchange:
RS−SR + 2 R′SH → 2 RSH + R′S−SR′
This reaction is important in nature.

Metal ion complexation
With metal ions, thiolates behave as ligands to form transition metal thiolate complexes. The term mercaptan is derived from the Latin mercurium captans (capturing mercury) because the thiolate group bonds so strongly with mercury compounds. According to hard/soft acid/base (HSAB) theory, sulfur is a relatively soft (polarizable) atom. This explains the tendency of thiols to bind to soft elements and ions such as mercury, lead, or cadmium. The stability of metal thiolates parallels that of the corresponding sulfide minerals.

Thioxanthates
Thiolates react with carbon disulfide to give thioxanthate.

Thiyl radicals 
Free radicals derived from mercaptans, called thiyl radicals, are commonly invoked to explain reactions in organic chemistry and biochemistry. They have the formula RS• where R is an organic substituent such as alkyl or aryl. They arise from or can be generated by a number of routes, but the principal method is H-atom abstraction from thiols. Another method involves homolysis of organic disulfides. In biology thiyl radicals are responsible for the formation of the deoxyribonucleic acids, building blocks for DNA. This conversion is catalysed by ribonucleotide reductase (see figure). Thiyl intermediates also are produced by the oxidation of glutathione, an antioxidant in biology. Thiyl radicals (sulfur-centred) can transform to carbon-centred radicals via hydrogen atom exchange equilibria. The formation of carbon-centred radicals could lead to protein damage via the formation of C−C bonds or backbone fragmentation.

Because of the weakness of the S−H bond, thiols can functioning as scavengers of free radicals.

Biological importance

Cysteine and cystine 
As the functional group of the amino acid cysteine, the thiol group plays a very important role in biology. When the thiol groups of two cysteine residues (as in monomers or constituent units) are brought near each other in the course of protein folding, an oxidation reaction can generate a cystine unit with a disulfide bond (−S−S−). Disulfide bonds can contribute to a protein's tertiary structure if the cysteines are part of the same peptide chain, or contribute to the quaternary structure of multi-unit proteins by forming fairly strong covalent bonds between different peptide chains. A physical manifestation of cysteine-cystine equilibrium is provided by hair straightening technologies.

Sulfhydryl groups in the active site of an enzyme can form noncovalent bonds with the enzyme's substrate as well, contributing to covalent catalytic activity in catalytic triads. Active site cysteine residues are the functional unit in cysteine protease catalytic triads. Cysteine residues may also react with heavy metal ions (Zn2+, Cd2+, Pb2+, Hg2+, Ag+) because of the high affinity between the soft sulfide and the soft metal (see hard and soft acids and bases). This can deform and inactivate the protein, and is one mechanism of heavy metal poisoning.

Drugs containing thiol group
6-Mercaptopurine (anticancer)
Captopril (antihypertensive)
D-penicillamine (antiarthritic)
Sodium aurothiolate (antiarthritic)

Cofactors
Many cofactors (non-protein-based helper molecules) feature thiols. The biosynthesis and degradation of fatty acids and related long-chain hydrocarbons is conducted on a scaffold that anchors the growing chain through a thioester derived from the thiol Coenzyme A. The biosynthesis of methane, the principal hydrocarbon on Earth, arises from the reaction mediated by coenzyme M, 2-mercaptoethyl sulfonic acid. Thiolates, the conjugate bases derived from thiols, form strong complexes with many metal ions, especially those classified as soft. The stability of metal thiolates parallels that of the corresponding sulfide minerals.

In skunks
The defensive spray of skunks consists mainly of low-molecular-weight thiols and derivatives with a foul odor, which protects the skunk from predators. Owls are able to prey on skunks, as they lack a sense of smell.

Examples of thiols

 Methanethiol – CH3SH [methyl mercaptan]
 Ethanethiol – C2H5SH [ethyl mercaptan]
 1-Propanethiol – C3H7SH [n-propyl mercaptan]
 2-Propanethiol – CH3CH(SH)CH3 [2C3 mercaptan]
 Allyl mercaptan CH2=CHCH2SH [2-propenethiol]
 Butanethiol – C4H9SH [n-butyl mercaptan]
 tert-Butyl mercaptan – (CH3)3CSH [t-butyl mercaptan]
 Pentanethiols – C5H11SH [pentyl mercaptan]
 Thiophenol – C6H5SH
 Dimercaptosuccinic acid
 Thioacetic acid
 Coenzyme A
 Glutathione
 Metallothionein
 Cysteine
 2-Mercaptoethanol
 Dithiothreitol/dithioerythritol (an epimeric pair)
 2-Mercaptoindole
 Grapefruit mercaptan
 Furan-2-ylmethanethiol
 3-Mercaptopropane-1,2-diol
 3-Mercapto-1-propanesulfonic acid
 1-Hexadecanethiol
 Pentachlorobenzenethiol

See also
 Doctor sweetening process
 Odorizer
 Persulfide
 Saville reaction
 Thiol-disulfide exchange

References

External links
 Mercaptans (or Thiols) at The Periodic Table of Videos (University of Nottingham)
 Applications, Properties, and Synthesis of ω-Functionalized n-Alkanethiols and Disulfides – the Building Blocks of Self-Assembled Monolayers by D. Witt, R. Klajn, P. Barski, B.A. Grzybowski at Northwestern University.
 Mercaptan, by The Columbia Electronic Encyclopedia
 What is Mercaptan?, by Columbia Gas of Pennsylvania and Maryland.
 What Is the Worst Smelling Chemical?, by About Chemistry.

 
Functional groups
Organosulfur compounds